Vijay Nahar (born 8 November 1942) is an Indian author and historian known for his reference books on Indian history and political leaders.

Career
Nahar has worked for 25 years as a Pracharak of Rashtriya Swayamsevak Sangh in Haryana and Rajasthan. His younger brother Dharmchand Nahar devoted his life for Nation in RSS. Nahar is currently President of Marudhar Vidyapeeth Samiti, Pali. He has also worked as founder secretary in Rajasthan Vanvasi Kalyan Parishad and Rajasthan Prodh Siksha Sansthan, Jaipur; and various other positions in the Rajasthan Region.
He is also MISA detainee and protested against emergency applied by Congress government of India in 1975.
He shared experience of emergency at 113rd birth celebration of Jayprakash Narayan that "RSS workers took out a funeral in protest of the emergency in Udaipur during the Emergency.The workers were shouting slogans. Then the police made the hoop, then the workers put the effigy on the road. The problem in front of the police was that what to do? There was a strange situation in carrying out the police station with their hands." 
He has been worked as RSS Pracharak from 1955 to 1982 in Haryana and Rajasthan region. During 1977, 38 MLAs of Bhartiya Janta Party were won out of 40 constituencies of Udaipur in his leadership. He was RSS Vibhak Pracharak of Udaipur at that time.

Books
Nahar has published a book on Prime Minister Narendra Modi titled Swarnim Bharat Ke Swapndrishtha Narendra Modi, published by Pinkcity Publishers and selected for government school libraries in Rajasthan. The book was released by RSS leader Indresh Kumar, former State BJP President of Rajasthan Ashok Parnami, and former Vice Chancellor of MDS University P. L. Chaturvedi at Rajasthan Chamber of Commerce and Industries. The book attracted notice in the media after its release in 2014. Nahar released three books in 2016. The first is a history of Malwa Parmar Samrat titled Samrat Bhoj Parmar, published by Pinkcity Publishers. That book was launched by Rajasthan Higher Education Minister Kalicharan Saraf.

Another book  by Nahar covered Vasundhara Raje and was titled Vasundhara Raje aur Vikasit Rajasthan, published by Prabhat Prakashan. This book was gifted to the Governor of Rajasthan at Rajbhawan before its market release. It is the first book written on Raje till date. Rajasthan Governor Kalyan Singh has praised Nahar's research on Indian history. Nahar's third book is on the experiences and struggles of the emergency period of 25 June 1975 to 21 March 1977, titled Aapaatkaal Ke Kaale Divas. That book was released by former Rajasthan Panchayati Raj Mantri Surendra Goyal, former Vidhansabha Upmukhya Sachetak Madan Rathore, ADM of Pali Chandoliya, SP of Pali Bhargav, and Pali MLA Gyanchand Parakh on Independence Day in 2016. Nahar's next book, Prarambhik Islamic Aakraman Evam Bhartiya Pratirodh, is based on the struggle of Indian Kings during 600 years of Indian history from the failed attacks by khalifas to the attacks by Bakhtiyar Khilji.
 
RSS Sarsanghchalak Mohan Bhagwat launched Nahar's book on the life of Deendayal Upadhyaya, titled Aadhunik Bharat Ke Bramharshi-Pt. Deendayal Upadhyaya. This book was published by Pinkcity Publishers, and Rajasthan Home Minister Gulab Chand Kataria inaugurated the book at his residence. Vijay Nahar said to media in the press conference that he first met Pt. Upadhyaya at Sirohi in 1962. The book highlights the contributions of Upadhyaya to the nation of India. The book was praised in the educational magazine Shaikshik Manthan for Nahar's unique approach of covering the stories of Upadhyaya in a separate section after exploring the life journey and ekatm manavvaad theory of Pt. Deendayal Upadhyaya.

His books on 1st and 9th jain terapanth aacharyas are Mrityunjay Mahayogi Aacharya Bhikshu and Yugdrishtha Yugpurush Aacharya Tulsi. Book on first acharya and founder of terapanth Acharya  Bhikshu was released by Terapanth Acharya Mahashraman at Pali Marwar.

Nahar has written seven books on the Indian history from 467 A.D. to 1200 A.D. and discovered the real facts of Indian kings and highlighted their strength and struggle with inside and outside enemies in this particular period which is known as Andhkar Yug in the most of historical books.
His book entitled Sheeladitya Samrat Harshvardhan Evam Unka Yug is published in 2013 covered the history of north India and Indian kingdom from 467 A.D. to 810 A.D.. Nahar represented the picture of united and powerful north India and success and struggles of Samrat Harshvardhan in this period with strong references. This is noted as first book written on specifically Samrat Harshvardhan. His other books on this series are Samrat Yashovarman, Samrat Mihir Bhoj Evam Unka Yug, Samrat Bhoj Parmar, Prarambhik Islamic Aakraman Evam Bhartiya Pratirodh, Yugpurush Bapparawal and Samrat Prithviraj Chauhan.

His book Hinduva Surya Maharana Pratap on the history of Mewar and Life of Maharana Pratap uncovered many facts about Birth Place of Maharana Pratap, Victory of Haldighati Battle, Daughter of Maharana Pratap, hypothetical story of grass and character of Akbar with strong references and evidences. Newspaper Udaipur Kiran says that the book of Vijay Nahar resolves the misconceptions written in Indian history about Maharana Pratap.

Nahar's next research work on Mewar history, "Yugpurush Bapparawal," is centred on the dynasty, war, and life of indian ruler Bappa rawal and was revealed by Akhil Bharatiya Itihas Sankalan Yojana's National General Secretary Balmukund Pandey and National Vice President Prof. KS. Gupt.

His next book "Hindwa Soorya Maharana Pratap Ki Janmsthali - Punyadhara Pali" was inaugurated at Maharana Pratap's birthplace, Juni Kachari, Pali, Rajasthan, by BJP MLA of Pali Gyanchand Parakh , former MP of Pali Pushp Jain and Padma Shri Arjun Singh Shekhawat. The book was published by the Bhartiya Itihas Sankalan Yojana Pali Unit. In this book, Nahar provides conclusive proof that Maharana Pratap was born in Pali. According to the book, Maharana Pratap was born in the Pali palaces on Vikram Samvat Jyeshtha Shukla Tritiya Sunday Samvat 1597, i.e. 1540 AD, from the womb of Jaywanti Devi, daughter of Pali emperor Songara Akheraj.

Bibliography

Books
Hinduva Surya Maharana Pratap (2011)
Mrityunjay Mahayogi Aacharya Bhikshu (2012)
Sheeladitya Samrat Harshvardhan Evam Unka Yug (2013)
Shivambu Sanjeevani (2013)
Yugdrishtha Yugpurush Aacharya Tulsi (2013)
Oswal Nahar Vansh (2014)
Samrat Yashovarman (2014)
Swarnim Bharat Ke Swapndrishtha Narendra Modi (2014)
Samrat Mihir Bhoj Evam Unka Yug (2015)
Vasundhara Raje aur Vikasit Rajasthan (2016)
Bhaktimayi Mahasati Ranabai-Harnava (2016)
Aapaatkal Ke Kaale Diwas (2016)
Samrat Bhoj Parmar (2016) 
Aadhunik Bharat Ke Bramharshi-Pt. Deendayal Upadhyaya (2017)
Yugpurush Bapparawal (2018)
Hindwa Soorya Maharana Pratap Ki Janmsthali Punyadhara Pali (2022) 
Veer Shiromani Samrat Prithviraj Chauhan (In two parts) (2022)

Awards and felicitations
Nahar has been jailed for protesting Emergency. He has worked as RSS Vibhag Pracharak of Udaipur at the time of emergency. Rajasthan State Energy minister Pushpendra Singh Ranawat, Pali MLA Gyanchand Parakh and BJP committee of Pali district awarded him for his duty as National security guard against the tortures of the Indra Gandhi government during the Emergency.   
Nahar is felicitated by Sundar singh bhandari cheritable trust for his work and contribution for Rashtriya Swayamsevak Sangh at UIT auditorium,Kota in year 2018. Program was chaired by Rajasthan home minister Gulab Chand Kataria and Central social justice minister Thanvarchand Gehlot.
On 23 June 2019, Once again Sundar Singh Bhandari trust, Udaipur awarded Nahar for his nation service, books on real Indian history and his work for connecting tribal people with mainstream of society. Award was given by Rajasthan Opposition Party Leader and Ex. Rajasthan Home Minister Gulab Chand Kataria at Municipal Corporation Auditorium, Udaipur.
Vijay Nahar was honored with the "Pandit Ravi Shankar Lokjan Itihas Samman" for the preservation of Indian history and writing of original history of India through his published books at the Maharana Bhupal Singh Samman Samaroh-2022, which was held on 27 February 2022 under the joint aegis of Lokjan Seva Sansthan and Rajasthan Vidyapeeth Udaipur.

See also
 List of Indian writers

References

1942 births
Living people
Rajasthani people
India
People from Pali district
20th-century Indian historians
21st-century Indian historians
Writers from Rajasthan
20th-century Indian non-fiction writers
21st-century Indian non-fiction writers
Indian political writers